Look Ahead is a studio album by Pat Boone, released in 1968 on Dot Records. It became his last album for the label.

Track listing

References 

1968 albums
Pat Boone albums
Dot Records albums